Shiner is a 2000 crime film written by Scott Cherry and directed by John Irvin and starring Michael Caine and Martin Landau. It was shot in London.

Plot
The story centers on Billy "Shiner" Simpson a boxing promoter banned from legitimate fights until he finds a promising start in his son Eddie. The night of the fight sees Eddie killed, and Simpson suspects rival Frank Spedding. Billy seeks revenge, only to grow mad as his suspicions draw closer to home.

Cast
 Michael Caine as Billy "Shiner" Simpson
 Martin Landau as Frank Spedding 
 Frances Barber as Georgie 
 Frank Harper as Jeff "Stoney" Stone 
 Andy Serkis as Mel
 Matthew Marsden as Eddie "Golden Boy" Simpson
 Kenneth Cranham as Gibson "Gibbo"

Reception
Jane Crowther of the BBC said, "A Lear-like construction serves well to show the gradual unraveling of a ruthlessly ambitious man trading on familial loyalty and past glory."

The score by Paul Grabowsky effectively creates a disturbing and sinister mood.

References

External links

 

2000 films
2000s crime action films
British crime action films
British boxing films
Films shot in London
Films directed by John Irvin
2000s English-language films
2000s British films